The Emborcação Dam, also known as Theodomiro Santiago, is an embankment dam on the Paranaíba River near Araguari in Minas Gerais, Brazil. It was constructed for hydroelectric power production and flood control.

Background
Feasibility studies for the dam occurred in 1971 and in June 1977, construction on the dam began. In August 1981, the dam began to impound the reservoir and the first generator became operation in 1982, the last in 1983. The dam was inaugurated in 1983 by Brazilian president João Batista Figueiredo.

Dam

Emborcação Hydroelectric Power Plant

See also

List of power stations in Brazil

References

Dams completed in 1983
Dams in Minas Gerais
Embankment dams
1983 establishments in Brazil